Daler Tukhtasunov (Dalerjon Tukhtasunov; born 27 August 1986) is a Tajik professional footballer who plays as a defender.

Career
He previously played for Vakhsh Qurghonteppa and Torpedo Zhodino.'

He played for Tajikistan in 2008 AFC Challenge Cup, 2012 AFC Challenge Cup.

Career statistics

International

Statistics accurate as of match played 7 June 2016

International goals

Honours
Vakhsh Qurghonteppa
Tajik League (1): 2009
Istiklol
Tajik Supercup (1): 2010
Tajik Cup (1): 2003
Regar-TadAZ
Tajik Cup (1): 2012
Ravshan Kulob
Tajik League (1): 2013

References

External links
 
 

1986 births
Living people
Tajikistani footballers
Place of birth missing (living people)
Association football defenders
Tajikistan international footballers
Tajikistani expatriate footballers
Expatriate footballers in Belarus
Tajikistani expatriate sportspeople in Belarus
Tajikistan Higher League players
Footballers at the 2006 Asian Games
FC Torpedo-BelAZ Zhodino players
Vakhsh Qurghonteppa players
FC Istiklol players
Asian Games competitors for Tajikistan